Delaware City Historic District is a national historic district located at Delaware City, New Castle County, Delaware. It encompasses 204 contributing buildings and 1 contributing site in the town of Delaware City. The buildings were built between about 1826 and 1930.  They are primarily residential buildings, with some commercial and institutional buildings including notable examples of the Greek Revival and Italianate styles.  Notable buildings include the Delaware City Hotel (1828), Central Hotel (c. 1835), Christ Episcopal Church (1849) and Rectory (1870), Van Hekle House (1828), Delaware City Academy (1858), Delaware City Public School (1883), Dunlap/Worrell House (c. 1826), and First Presbyterian Church (c. 1835).

It was listed on the National Register of Historic Places in 1983.

Gallery

References

Historic districts on the National Register of Historic Places in Delaware
Historic districts in New Castle County, Delaware
National Register of Historic Places in New Castle County, Delaware